Dyke TV was founded and created by Ana Maria Simo, playwright and cofounder of Lesbian Avengers; Linda Chapman, theater director and producer; and Mary Patierno, independent film and video maker. The first episode was aired on June 8, 1993, in New York City. The last episode aired in 2005. Dyke TV produced national documentary television programming. New episodes were produced weekly for the shows 12 years on air, and ran for a half hour. In January 2005, the last five episodes ran for an hour. It was broadcast on nationwide cable TV weekly from 1993 to 2005, reaching over 6.5 million households nationwide, as well as being screened at national and international film festivals.  In 1994, Dyke TV was awarded a Hometown Video Festival Award.

Viewership 
Early on, Dyke TV was broadcast only through public access television in New York, but had the goal of creating a strong national network. Within the first year they worked to reach that goal and expanded by the week, reaching 15 cities by 1994. At its height, the show was accessible in 61 cities across the United States, including being picked up by PBS in Denver Colorado which significantly increased accessibility in the area. Dyke TV also sold tapes, including quarterly subscriptions or best of compilations, giving out of network fans the opportunity to watch the show.

Importance of Dyke TV 
Dyke TV was created with the intention to provide empowerment for lesbians and increase visibility of lesbian issues, culture and community. Their mission, and their motto was to "Incite, Subvert, Provoke and Organize." Each episode began with news coverage of lesbian-related issues. Then, the episode covered diverse aspects of different lesbian communities, including art, health, politics, music, sports, etc.  Those featured in the episodes came from diverse racial and socioeconomic backgrounds, highlighting intersectional issues within the lesbian community.

The decade of the 1990s was a pivotal time for the LGBT community, with the rise of HIV/AIDS and the rise of ACT UP, the Riot grrrl Movement and Queercore, the murder of Brandon Teena, and pro and anti LGBTQ+ legislation across the country, including Oregon Ballot Measure 9 (1992).  Many of these issues were not discussed widely in mainstream news. Of the LGBTQ+ news that was discussed, the issues of cisgender gay men were highlighted, leaving behind much of the Queer community. Founder Linda Chapman remarked, Co-founder Ana Simo "was looking for a better way to promote Lesbian Avengers and this seemed really ideal.” solidifying Dyke TV's position as fundamentally activism oriented. Thus, Dyke TV was pivotal in highlighting often-unseen LGBTQ+ issues and news, particularly within the lesbian community.

Participation  
Dyke TV was almost entirely run by volunteers, with only three paid staff members. Everything from networking and fundraising to production and distribution was volunteer based. Episodes were filmed, hosted and produced in New York City at the Dyke TV studio, but most segments were sent in from volunteer stringers and correspondents from across the country.

Segments 
Dyke TV ran for 322 episodes. Information about each segment can be found in the collection guide for the records at the Sophia Smith Collection, Smith College.

News 
Coverage ranged from international issues like the war is Bosnia and Herzegovina to domestic LGBT issues, particularly those that affect lesbians including the political debates around marriage and Don't Ask Don't Tell. In line with the shows activist sensibilities, Dyke TV strove to report underrepresented cases of violence against Lesbians, Gay Men and Trans people. From the firebombing of Lesbian AIDS activist Dee Deberry's home in Tampa Florida, to the racially motivated murder by firebomb of a Lesbian Hattie Mae Cohens and a Gay man, Brian Mock, at their home Salem Oregon. 
Documenting the activism of the radical queer organizations was a central goal of the show. The direct action tactics of the Lesbian Avengers were covered weekly on the news.

Arts 
The Arts showcased lesbian work in the art world through interviews of artists or reporting on festivals and events. The segment ran new features weekly and was hosted by poet and performance artist Pamela Sneed. Notable features include filmmaker Cheryl Dunye, Actress and performance artist Carmelita Tropicana and Singer Ani Difranco.

I Was a Lesbian Child 
The popular segment “I was a lesbian child” featured the childhood photos and home videos of viewers and contributors. Those featured provided humorous voice overs narrating their childhoods and emphasising that they had always been gay. The name of the segment came from a 1992 Lesbian Avengers campaign to push for the gay and lesbian inclusive “Rainbow Curriculum” in New York City public schools, where they wore T-shirts proclaiming “I was a lesbian child.”

References

External links 
 Dyke TV records at the Sophia Smith Collection, Smith College
 DYKE TV Get Turned on! News and Views from DYKE TV-Land January-March 1995 Vol. 2 Issue. 1

1993 establishments in New York City
1993 American television series debuts
2005 American television series endings
Lesbian-related television shows
1990s American LGBT-related television series